Magnaporthe is a genus of ascomycete fungi. Several of the species are cereal pathogens. There are five species in the widespread genus.

References 

Sordariomycetes genera
Magnaporthales
Fungal plant pathogens and diseases